Chad "Tank" Cook (born July 24, 1985) is a former American football fullback. He played college football at Murray State University. He was signed as an undrafted free agent by the Tampa Bay Storm in 2010.

College career
Cook was a running back for the Murray State University Racers.

Professional career

Tampa Bay Storm
Cook signed with the Tampa Bay Storm in 2010, only playing for the Storm as a linebacker.

Oklahoma City Yard Dawgz
Cook later caught on with the Oklahoma City Yard Dawgz, to finish out the 2010 season.

San Jose SaberCats
Cook signed with the San Jose SaberCats for the 2011 season. Cook had the best season in SaberCats history for a fullback, breaking team records for rushing attempts (99), rushing yards (294) and rushing touchdowns (30). Cook's play landed him on the All-Arena Second Team as a fullback.

San Antonio Talons
Cook signed with the San Antonio Talons for the 2012 season. Cook re-signed with the Talons for the 2013 season.

References

External links
 San Antonio Talons Bio

1985 births
Living people
Players of American football from New Orleans
American football fullbacks
Murray State Racers football players
Arkansas Twisters players
Tampa Bay Storm players
Oklahoma City Yard Dawgz players
San Jose SaberCats players
San Antonio Talons players